Animal crackers are a snack of sweet crackers in animal shapes.

Animal Crackers may also refer to:

Film and television
 Animal Crackers (1930 film), the 1930 Marx Brothers movie based on the Broadway play
 Animal Crackers (comic), any of several comic strips
 Animal Crackers (TV series), 1997 animated TV series based on one of the comic strips
Animal Crackers (1937 comic strip), American newspaper comic strip
 Animal Kwackers, a 1975 British children's television series
 Animal Crackers (2017 film), an animated movie starring Ian McKellen, Danny DeVito, and Sylvester Stallone

Music
 Animal Crackers (album), the first album by Wee Hairy Beasties
 The Animal Crackers (band), a Cincinnati, Ohio DJ group
 "Animal Crackers", tune by Duke Ellington
 Animal Crackers (musical), the 1928 Broadway play by George S. Kaufman and Morrie Ryskind starring the Marx Brothers
 "Animal Crackers in My Soup", a song sung by Shirley Temple in the 1935 movie Curly Top
 "Animal Crackers", a 1968 song by Melanie Safka

Other uses
 Animal Cracker Conspiracy Puppet Company, a puppet company co-founded by Iain Gunn and Bridget Rountree
 "The Animal-Cracker Plot", a science fiction short story written by L. Sprague de Camp
 An early development name for the puzzle game It's Mr. Pants